Cooperl Arc Atlantique (a.k.a. Cooperl) is the largest pork processing company in France.

Overview
Cooperl Arc Atlantique was founded in 1966. The company breeds pigs, kills them in slaughterhouses, and distributes cut pieces of pork for sale. Its slaughterhouses are located in Montfort-sur-Meu, and its head office is in Lamballe, both of which are located in Brittany.

In 2012, the company opened a branch in Beijing, China and Moscow, Russia.

As of 2015, it is the largest pork processing company in France. Its competitor is Groupe Bigard.

2015 French pork production crisis
In August 2015, both Cooperl Arc Atlantique and Groupe Bigard refused to accept the price set at the Marché du Porc Breton in Plérin, which is used as the norm across France, on the basis that it was too high in comparison with the price set by other European countries like Germany, where both companies also sell pork.

References

Food and drink companies established in 1966
Companies based in Brittany
Pork
Meat companies of France
French companies established in 1966